This is a list of members of the Tasmanian House of Assembly between the 30 May 1928 election and the 9 May 1931 election. The 1928 election failed to deliver a majority, and the Nationalists' John McPhee took over from Labor's Joseph Lyons as Premier of Tasmania. Lyons subsequently retired from state politics, obtaining election to the Federal seat of Wilmot and going on to become Prime Minister of Australia in 1931.

Notes
  Labor MHA for Wilmot, Joseph Lyons, resigned to contest the federal seat of Wilmot at the 1929 election. A recount on 27 September 1929 resulted in Labor candidate William Shoobridge being elected.
  Labor MHA for Bass, Allan Guy, resigned to contest the federal seat of Bass. Due to the ballot papers from the previous election having been lost in a flood, some delays were encountered, but the Nationalists did not nominate a candidate, and Thomas Davies was declared elected on 5 October 1929.

Sources
 
 Parliament of Tasmania (2006). The Parliament of Tasmania from 1856

Members of Tasmanian parliaments by term
20th-century Australian politicians